Kathleen Patricia Brennan (born 1955) is an American musician, songwriter, record producer, and artist. She is known for her work as a co-writer, producer, and influence on the work of her husband Tom Waits.

Biography
Brennan was born in Cork, Ireland and grew up in Johnsburg, Illinois in the US, after her family moved there when she was young. Brennan and Waits first met in 1978 when Waits made his acting debut in Paradise Alley while Brennan was a scriptwriter, and then again during production of the Francis Ford Coppola film One from the Heart. At the time, Brennan worked at the American Zoetrope studio as a script analyst, while Waits composed the score for One from the Heart. According to Waits, they met on New Year's Eve.

Waits dedicated his 1980 song Jersey Girl to Brennan, and they were married later that year in the Always Forever Wedding Chapel. After they married, Brennan encouraged Waits to become his own producer. 

Brennan is generally regarded as the catalyst for Waits' shift towards more experimental sound beginning with the 1983 album Swordfishtrombones, which Waits produced on dare from Brennan. Her first co-writing credit appears on Rain Dogs in 1985 for "Hang Down Your Head", and by 1992 she was his main producer and constant song-writing partner; her record collection introduced him to the music of Captain Beefheart. Her work includes co-writing and collaboration on the albums Franks Wild Years (1987), Alice (2002), and Blood Money (2002), as well as the musicals The Black Rider (1989) and Woyzeck (2000). 

Waits has described Brennan as "a remarkable collaborator... She's bold, inventive and fearless. That's who you wanna go in the woods with, right? Somebody who finishes your sentences for you." Waits has also said: "She doesn't like the limelight, but she's an incandescent presence on all songs we work on together." In 2008, Waits described their collaboration as "one person holds the nail and the other one swings the hammer". In 2020, Brennan described Waits' songs as either "grim reapers" or "grand weepers".

Honors and awards
In 2015, Brennan and Waits were honored as part of the This Is Dedicated: Music's Greatest Marriages show by Jarrod Spector and Kelli Barrett.

In 2016, Brennan was honored, along with Waits and John Prine, at The Song Lyrics of Literary Excellence Awards from PEN New England. The event was hosted by the JFK Library; during the event Colum McCann honored the creative partnership of Brennan and Waits, stating, "The world as we have it is their lucky anthem. They fling it open with their lives and a few strings and a voice that was somehow scratched by heaven.".

Personal life 
Brennan and Waits live in northern California with their three children.

References

1955 births
Living people
People from Johnsburg, Illinois
American women composers
Record producers from Illinois
American women painters
Songwriters from Illinois
21st-century American women artists
American women record producers